Sun Sijing (born December 1951) is a retired general of the People's Liberation Army who served as Political Commissar of the People's Armed Police.

Biography 
Sun Sijing was born in Qingdao, Shandong in December 1951. He joined the People's Liberation Army (PLA) in 1969, and began work as a political liaison in an artillery force. He rose through the ranks serving in mostly political roles - that is, he presumably did not have much combat experience. In 1999 he became political commissar of the PLA's First Medical University, and by October 2002 became political commissar of the 301 Military Hospital, the top hospital of the PLA and often used as a treatment facility for top civilian leaders as well. In 2005 he became deputy political commissar of the Logistics Department. In December 2010 he became political commissar of the PLA Academy of Military Science. In July 2013 he was promoted to the rank of General, the highest non-wartime rank in the PLA. In December 2014 he became political commissar of the People's Armed Police.

Sun was a member of the 17th Central Commission for Discipline Inspection and of the 18th Central Committee of the Communist Party of China.

References

1951 births
Living people
People's Liberation Army generals from Shandong
Political commissars of the People's Armed Police
Politicians from Qingdao
Chinese Communist Party politicians from Shandong
People's Republic of China politicians from Shandong